Aprus (French: Apre, Epvre, Evre or Avre) is a Latin masculine given name that may refer to:

 Aprus of Reims, archbishop of Reims from 328 to 350
 Aprus of Toul (died 507), bishop of Toul
 Aprus of Sens, 7th-century saint, priest and hermit
 Aprus, a deity or hero posited by Jacob Grimm as the namesake for the month of April
 Aprus (Thrace), an ancient Thracian town, later a Roman city

See also
 Apris, in Sanskrit a special invocation related to an animal sacrifice
 Aper (disambiguation), an alternate spelling of Aprus

Latin masculine given names